Hans Danielsson also known as Hasse Danielsson (born 11 August 1958) is a former speedway rider from Sweden.

Speedway career 
Danielsson rode in the top tier of British Speedway from 1978 until 1981, riding for various clubs.

He won the silver medal in 1981 and bronze medal in 1980 at the Swedish Championship. 

He stood as reserve for the final of the Speedway World Championship in the 1980 Individual Speedway World Championship.

References 

1945 births
Living people
Swedish speedway riders
Birmingham Brummies riders
King's Lynn Stars riders
Wolverhampton Wolves riders